List of the National Register of Historic Places listings in Fulton County, New York

This is intended to be a complete list of properties and districts listed on the National Register of Historic Places in Fulton County, New York.  The locations of National Register properties and districts (at least for all showing latitude and longitude coordinates below) may be seen in a map by clicking on "Map of all coordinates".  Two listings, Johnson Hall and Adirondack Park, are further designated National Historic Landmarks of the United States.



Listings county-wide

|}

See also

National Register of Historic Places listings in New York

References

External links

Fulton County, New York
Fulton County